Celebrity Nightmares Decoded is a show that airs on FYI (formerly The Biography Channel) in the United States. It premiered on Saturday, September 18, 2010 at 10pm EST.

Description 

"Everyone dreams of being rich and famous, but what do the rich and famous dream about? Lost love, hidden phobias, or haunting memories from their past? It's all there, trapped in their subconscious, waiting to be decoded" ~ Lauren Lawrence

Lauren Lawrence, who has been interpreting the dreams of famous celebrities for over 10 years, is a columnist for the NY Daily News and has written several well reviewed books including "Private Dreams of Public People" breaks down the nightmares of the stars that have haunted them.

Celebrity Nightmares Decoded airs on Saturdays at 10PM on Bio.

EPISODE GUIDE

Episode 1

Bay Watch's Nicole Eggert, Dustin Diamond from Saved by the Bell, Danielle Staub from Real Housewives of New Jersey and the rapper Too Short and aired September 17, 2011

Episode 2

Carnie Wilson of the popular singing group Wilson Phillips, Jeremy Jackson of Baywatch Fame, Christopher Knight from The Brady Bunch, and "Cheetah Girl" Adrienne Bailon and aired September 23, 2011.

Episode 3

Actor Stephen Baldwin, Top Model Winner Adrienne Curry, Lark Voorhees from Saved by the Bell and poker champion Beth Shak aired September 28, 2011.

More episodes to air in 2012.

Format 

A celebrity sits down with a dream analyst and discusses his or her nightmare. After going through key symbols of their dreams, the analyst is amble to explain to them what their dream means.

The pilot includes host and dream analyst Lauren Lawrence, Bronson Pinchot, Jodie Sweetin, Rachel Dratch, and Barry Williams.

The show is produced by Sharp Entertainment and is distributed by AENT to the Biography Channel.

References

External links 
http://www.biography.com/tv/celebrity-nightmares-decoded
http://www.biography.com/video.do?name=biography&bcpid=28522551001&bclid=610242077001&bctid=610716360001

The Biography Channel shows